Terrie Bluff is a rock bluff rising to ,  south-southeast of Ainley Peak, in the Kyle Hills on Ross Island. It was named by the Advisory Committee on Antarctic Names in 2005 after Theresa "Terrie" M. Williams, Professor of Ecology and Evolutionary Biology at the University of California, Santa Cruz. She was the US Antarctic Program co-principal investigator of hunting behavior of free-ranging Weddell seals for several seasons in the McMurdo Sound sea ice areas, from 1984 to 2002.

References

Cliffs of Ross Island